Gerlach II, Count of Nassau-Wiesbaden (1333–1386) was the eldest son of Adolph I, Count of Nassau-Wiesbaden-Idstein and his wife Margaret of Nuremberg.  When his father died in 1370, he inherited Nassau-Wiesbaden.

He married Agnes, a daughter of Henry II of Veldenz.  The marriage remained childless.  After his death, his younger brother, Walram IV , inherited Wiesbaden.

1333 births
1386 deaths
14th-century German nobility
Counts of Nassau